USS Patrol No. 10 (SP-85), often rendered as USS Patrol #10, was an armed motorboat that served in the United States Navy as a patrol vessel from 1917 to 1919.

Patrol No. 10 was built privately  as Hull No. 288 or Greenport Hull No. 288 in 1916 by Greenport Basin and Construction Company at Greenport on Long Island, New York. She was similar to two boats built by Greenport for Russia but taken over by the U.S. Navy: Greenport Hull No. 287, which became USS Hetman (SP-1150), and Greenport Hull 288, which became USS Russ (SP-1151).

The U.S. Navy acquired the boat on 3 May 1917 and commissioned her for service in World War I as USS Patrol No. 10 (SP-85) on 3 October 1917.

Patrol No. 10 operated in the 3rd Naval District, headquartered at New York City, on patrol throughout the United States' participation in World War I. She was decommissioned postwar and was awaiting disposal by 1919. By February 1920 she was for sale, and she was sold on 5 August 1921.

Notes

References

Department of the Navy: Naval Historical Center: Online Library of Selected Images: U.S. Navy Ships: USS Patrol # 10 (SP-85), 1917-1921
NavSource Online: Section Patrol Craft Photo Archive Patrol No.10 (SP 85)

Patrol vessels of the United States Navy
World War I patrol vessels of the United States
Ships built in Greenport, New York
1917 ships